Give Us Barabbas is the fifth studio album of the American rock band Masters of Reality, released in 2004.

Material for the album comes from sessions for a planned release on Epic Records in the mid 1990s entitled The Ballad of Jody Frosty, which was shelved at the time, hence the change in line-up. The recording coincides with the live album How High the Moon, released in 1997.

Track listing 
All songs by Chris Goss, except where noted.
"The Ballad of Jody Frosty" - 7:30
"Voice and the Vision" - 3:38
"I Walk Beside Your Love" (Chris Goss, Chris Palmer, Brendon McNichol) - 2:55
"Bela Alef Rose" - 3:28
"Brown House on the Green Road" - 3:35
"Hey Diana" (Goss, Palmer, McNichol) - 3:07
"Still on the Hill" - 1:16
"The Desert Song" (Goss, Ginger Baker, Daniel Rey, Googe) - 3:34
"Off to Tiki Ti" (Goss, Palmer, McNichol) - 2:31
"It's So Hard" (John Lennon) - 2:29
"Jindalee Jindalie" - 4:27
"Don't Get Caught by the Huntsman's Bow" - 2:57

Credits 
Chris Goss - vocals, guitar, keyboard
Googe - bass guitar
Victor Indrizzo - drums

 Additional personnel
Chris Palmer - drums - ("It's So Hard")
Ginger Baker - drums - ("The Desert Song")
Scott Weiland - guest vocals - ("Jindalee Jindalie")
Lily Haydn - violin - ("Brown House on the Green Road")
Andy Kaulkin - electric piano - ("Brown House on the Green Road")
Brendon McNichol - mandolin and balalaika guitar - ("Off To Tiki Ti"), ("Hey Diana") and ("I Walk Beside Your Love")

References

 

Masters of Reality albums
2004 albums